Bojo is a Filipino rock band from Olongapo City, Philippines.

Early life

Bojo (Robert Joseph De Dios) started his career back in 2006 winning several rock competitions before winning the coveted Colt 45 rockista in 2006.

Members

Robert Joseph "Bojo" De Dios (vocals)
Err Sape (vocals)
Raymond "Patras" Ramos (lead guitar)
Krispen "Soul" Deloroso (bass)
Jackson "Jack" Perez (drums)
Genes "G" Layda (keyboard)

Discography

Studio albums

Bojo (2007, Star Records)

Singles

"Magkakulay"
"Paalam"
"Kulitan"
"Maghihintay"
"Nasan Ka?"
"Noon At Ngayon"
"Walang Hangganan"

Filipino rock music groups
Musical groups established in 2006